Anja Bihlmaier (born 11 October 1978, Schwäbisch Gmünd) is a German conductor.

Biography
Bihlmaier's parents sang in a church choir, and she learned the recorder as a youth.  She later studied piano and violin.  Her teachers included Roland Baldini, Johannes Pfitzer and Volker Stenzl.  She continued piano studies with Elza Kolodin at the Staatliche Hochschule für Musik Freiburg, from which she graduated in 2003.

Bihlmaier studied conducting with Scott Sandmeier at the Hochschule für Musik Freiburg, and earned a conducting diploma in 2006.  From 2004 to 2005, she held a conducting scholarship at the Mozarteum Salzburg, where she was a pupil of Dennis Russell Davies and Jorge Rotter.  From 2005 to 2008, she was part of the Conductors' Forum of the German Music Council, and participated in conducting masterclasses with Sian Edwards, Peter Gülke, Günther Herbig, Gunter Kahlert, Kenneth Kiesler, Klauspeter Seibel and Jac van Steen.  Other conducting mentors have included Kirk Trevor, Tsung Yeh, Giordano Bellincampi, Karen Kamensek and Antony Hermus.

From 2006 to 2010, Bihlmaier worked as a repetiteur at the Theater Coburg, at the Theater Görlitz, and at the Theater für Niedersachsen Hildesheim.  From 2010 to 2013, Bihlmaier worked at the Theater Chemnitz as Zweite Kapellmeisterin (Second Kapellmeister) and assistant to the GMD (Generalmusikdirektor).  From 2013 to 2015, she was Zweite Kapellmeisterin of the Staatsoper Hannover.  From 2015 to 2018, Bihlmaier served as Erste Kapellmeisterin (First Kapellmeister) and deputy GMD of the Staatstheater Kassel.  She was the second titled female conductor in the history of the Staatstheater Kassel.

In July 2017, Bihlmaier conducted the St Margarethen Opera Festival production of Rigoletto, the first female conductor in the festival's history.  In November 2018, Bihlmaier first-guest conducted the Residentie Orchestra (Residentie Orkest).  She first guest-conducted the Lahti Symphony Orchestra in December 2018.  In May 2019, the Residentie Orkest announced the appointment of Bihlmaier as its next chief conductor, effective with the 2021-2022 season.  This appointment marks her first chief conductorship.  Bihlmaier is the first female conductor to be named chief conductor of the Residentie Orkest, and the second female conductor to be named chief conductor of any Dutch orchestra.  In September 2019, the Lahti Symphony Orchestra announced the appointment of Bihlmaier as its next principal guest conductor, effective with the 2020-2021 season, with an initial contract of 3 seasons.  She is the first female conductor named to the Lahti post.

References

External links
 Official homepage of Anja Bihlmaier
 Sulivan Sweetland agency page on Anja Bihlmaier
 'Ik wil zoveel meer zijn dan dirigent alleen', Residentie Orkest Dutch-language interview with Anja Bihlmaier

1978 births
Living people
Women conductors (music)
People from Schwäbisch Gmünd
21st-century women musicians
21st-century German conductors (music)